Mickey Mouse Clubhouse is an American interactive computer-animated preschool television series which was the first Mickey Mouse and computer-animated program for preschoolers. It aired from May 5, 2006, to November 6, 2016 on the Disney Channel. Produced by Disney Television Animation, the series was created by Disney veteran Bobs Gannaway. 125 episodes were produced.

Premise
Mickey, Minnie, Donald, Daisy, Goofy, and Pluto interact with the viewer to stimulate problem solving during a self contained story.

Once the problem of the episode has been explained, Mickey invites the viewers to join him at the Mousekedoer, a giant Mickey-head-shaped computer whose main function is to distribute the day's Mouseketools, a collection of objects needed to solve the day's problem, to Mickey.

One of them is a "Mystery Mouseketool" represented by a Question Mark, in which, when the words "Mystery Mouseketool" are said, the question mark changes into the Mouseketool the viewer gets to use. Another one is a "Mouseke-Think-About-It Tool" represented by a silhouette of Mickey's head with rotating gears, in which characters must think of what to use before telling the Tool "Mouseke-Think-About-It-Tool, we pick the (object)". Once the tools have been shown to Mickey on the Mousekedoer screen, they are quickly downloaded to Toodles, a small, Mickey-head-shaped flying extension of the Mousekedoer. By calling "Oh, Toodles!" Mickey summons him to pop up from where he is hiding and fly up to the screen so the viewer can pick which tool Mickey needs for the current situation. Rhymes are used throughout the show. For example, in "Mickey's Silly Problem", when the "Silly switch" turned on, Mickey for some reason, spoke in rhymes for half of the episode.

The show features two original songs performed by American alternative rock band They Might Be Giants, including the opening theme song, in which a variant of a Mickey Mouse Club chant ("Meeska Mooska Mickey Mouse!") is used to summon the Clubhouse. They Might Be Giants also perform the song used at the end of every episode, "Hot Dog!", which echoes Mickey's first spoken words in the 1929 short The Karnival Kid.

This is the first time that the major Disney characters have regularly appeared on television in computer-animated form. The characters previously appeared in CG form in 2003 at the Magic Kingdom theme park attraction Mickey's PhilharMagic, and then appeared in the 2004 direct-to-video  special Mickey's Twice Upon a Christmas.

After the show ended in 2016, it was succeeded by Mickey and the Roadster Racers (later renamed Mickey Mouse Mixed-Up Adventures), which ran from 2017 to 2021, and Mickey Mouse Funhouse, which started in 2021.

Episodes

Characters

Main
 Mickey Mouse (voiced by Wayne Allwine in Seasons 1–3, and Bret Iwan in Season 4) is the optimistic and easy going leader of The Sensational Six. He is very patient and caring, especially towards his pet dog Pluto. He's self-aware, and somewhat puts on a Bugs Bunny-esque disposition. He is Minnie's boyfriend.
 Minnie Mouse (voiced by Russi Taylor) is Mickey Mouse's girlfriend. She is often prone to being put in over-the-top experiences. 
 Goofy (voiced by Bill Farmer) is Mickey's dimwitted but well-meaning best friend. He is often prone to most of the slapstick presented in this series.
 Pluto (vocal effects provided by Bill Farmer) is Mickey's best pet dog. His arch-nemesis is Butch the Bulldog, whose owner is revealed to be Pete.
 Donald Duck (voiced by Tony Anselmo) is Mickey's short-tempered but good-natured best friend, and Daisy's boyfriend. He is often shown to display a short temper that is easily provoked.
 Daisy Duck (voiced by Tress MacNeille) is Donald's girlfriend who is prone to getting angered by his numerous antics.
 Toodles (voiced by Rob Paulsen in Seasons 3-4) is one of Mickey's equipment that he uses to present the items for every episode. He gains a face, a personality, a voice, and a love interest in Season 3.

Recurring
 Pete (voiced by Jim Cummings) 
 Chip and Dale (voiced by Tress MacNeille and Corey Burton respectively) 
 Ludwig Von Drake (voiced by Corey Burton) 
 Clarabelle Cow (voiced by April Winchell) 
 Willie the Giant (voiced by Will Ryan) 
 Martian Mickey (voiced by Wayne Allwine and Bret Iwan)
 Martian Minnie (voiced by Russi Taylor)
 Quoodles (voiced by Russi Taylor)
 Goofbot (voiced by Bill Farmer) 
 Santa Claus (voiced by Dee Bradley Baker)
 Mrs. Claus (voiced by Tress MacNeille)
 Baby Red Bird and Mommy Red Bird (vocal effects both provided by Tress MacNeille)
 Boo Boo Chicken and Coco the Monkey (vocal effects both provided by Dee Bradley Baker)
 Figaro, Butch the Bulldog, Mr. Pettibone, and Bella (vocal effects all provided by Frank Welker)

Guest appearances
 Mortimer Mouse (voiced by Maurice LaMarche) 
 Captain Goof-Beard (voiced by Dick Van Dyke) 
 Millie and Melody Mouse (voiced by Avalon Robbins and Grace Kaufman respectively) 
 The Singing Lock (voiced by Nika Futterman) 
 Count Mickula (voiced by Bret Iwan)
 Boodles (voiced by Chloë Grace Moretz) 
 Igor the Door (voiced by David Tennant)
 Cuckoo the Cuckoo Bird (vocal effects provided by Dee Bradley Baker)
 Goofles (voiced by Bill Farmer)

Production
Mickey Mouse was originally voiced by Wayne Allwine with Bret Iwan taking over the role following Allwine's death in 2009 (however, the final episode to feature Allwine as Mickey premiered posthumously on September 28, 2012). Bill Farmer, the voice actor for Goofy and Pluto, said in February 2014 that the recording of dialogue for new episodes has ceased, but that "it would be quite a while before the show runs out of new episodes for TV. We have been on the air consistently since 2006 and we started recording in 2004. So there is always a long lead-in time between recording and seeing it on TV. So don't worry more is still to come, we just are not making any more."

Broadcast and release
Since the show has ended its run, reruns air on Disney Junior and the show is also on Disney+

Home media

Reception

Critical reception 
Alessandra Stanley of The New York Times compared the television series to Wonder Pets!, saying that "Mickey Mouse Clubhouse is simpler, and sometimes less is more," writing, "For much of his television career, the mouse was more a master of ceremonies than a comic lead. Now he has been whittled down to a Mister Rogers role — kindly and didactic." Stuart Heritage of The Guardian included Mickey Mouse Clubhouse in their "Best shows to watch on Disney+" list, stating that preschoolers will respond enthusiastically and accept eagerly the show, compared to older children and adult who are likely to have no interest. Charles Curtis of USA Today ranked the television series 9th in their "20 best shows for kids right now" list, asserting, "Whether it's Mickey Mouse Clubhouse, Mickey and the Roadster Racers or Mickey Mouse Mixed-Up Adventures, they're all good." Larisa Wiseman of Common Sense Media rated the show a 4 out of 5 stars, complimented the educational value, saying the series teaches early mathematics skills, and praised the depiction of positive messages and role models, citing, teamwork, positive interactions, and encouragement of social interactions. 

David Perlmutter in The Encyclopedia of American Animated Television Shows says that the show "was yet another case of vintage cartoon characters embarrassing themselves for the enjoyment of preschoolers in a heavily dumbed-down format. While it demonstrated the wide appeal of the Disney brand, it also indicated that this brand could be compromised as any other could through association with an inferior product."

Accolades

Spin-off

Minnie's Bow-Toons

Minnie's Bow-Toons is a spin-off series which premiered in the fall of 2011 and concluded in 2016. It aired in the daytime Disney Junior programming block for younger audiences. It is based on the Mickey Mouse Clubhouse episode "Minnie's Bow-tique" and depicts Minnie's continuing adventures in business as proprietor of her own store which makes and sells bows for apparel and interior decoration with her friend Daisy. She interacts with many of the characters seen in the Mickey Mouse Clubhouse series.
The show has been revived with new episodes starting April 2021, renamed to Minnie’s Bow-Toons: Party Palace Pals, with the animation style of Mickey Mouse Clubhouse’s successor, Mickey Mouse Mixed-Up Adventures.

Notes

References

External links

 
 
 

Articles needing additional references from June 2017
2006 American television series debuts
2016 American television series endings
2000s American animated television series
2010s American animated television series
American children's animated adventure television series
American children's animated comedy television series
American children's animated fantasy television series
American children's animated musical television series
American preschool education television series
American computer-animated television series
Animated preschool education television series
English-language television shows
2000s preschool education television series
2010s preschool education television series
Disney Channel original programming
Disney Junior original programming
Donald Duck television series
Mickey Mouse television series
Mathematics education television series
Television series by Disney Television Animation
Television shows adapted into video games
American animated television spin-offs
Fictional locations of Disney